is a passenger railway station located in the city of Ageo, Saitama, Japan, operated by East Japan Railway Company (JR East).

Lines
Kita-Ageo Station is served by the Takasaki Line, with through Shonan-Shinjuku Line and Ueno-Tokyo Line services to and from the Tokaido Line.

Layout
The station has two side platforms, connected by a footbridge, with an elevated station building. The station is staffed.

Platforms

History 
The station opened on 17 December 1988.

Passenger statistics
In fiscal 2019, the station was used by an average of 15,721 passengers daily (boarding passengers only).

Surrounding area
 Saitama Prefectural Kita-Ageo High School
 Ageo Asamadai Post Office

See also
List of railway stations in Japan

References

External links

JR East station information 

Takasaki Line
Stations of East Japan Railway Company
Railway stations in Saitama Prefecture
Railway stations in Japan opened in 1988
Ageo, Saitama